Maurice Richard is an outdoor sculpture depicting the Canadian professional ice hockey player of the same name, installed outside Montreal's Bell Centre, in Quebec, Canada.

References

External links

 

Cultural depictions of Canadian men
Cultural depictions of hockey players
Downtown Montreal
Monuments and memorials in Montreal
Outdoor sculptures in Montreal
Sculptures of men in Canada
Statues in Canada
Statues of sportspeople